Kusunti (कुसुन्ती) is located in Lalitpur metropolitan city of Nepal. The area is small and is getting heavily populated in a short period of time. The reason behind this flow of people is the excavation of a large monument of Lord Shiva with live snakes taking care of this holy area. It is believed that one of the local residents dreamt of the monument being under the earth. Moreover, she told the locals about the order of God to unearth the monument the very next day. This was found to be true and afterwards there occurred a flow of Hindus from all over the country to pay their homage to Lord Shiva. Now there is a beautiful temple sheltering the statue of Lord Shiva and is famous as Pancheswor Mahadev (पञ्चेश्वर महादेव) throughout the area and around the country.

The native residents are people with caste Limbu,Bogati,Dhungana,KC,Gajurel,Khadka.etc.Majuwa chaur is a local park, which is a pleasant place to spend some time. You can get there by taking Bogati marga. You will most probably find the residents extremely friendly. In a short span of time this place is turning into a high class residential area.

Populated places in Lalitpur District, Nepal